Valentine Maher (17 May 1780 – January 1844) was an Irish Whig politician.

He was a member of Arthur's and a magistrate for County Tipperary.

References

External links
 

Members of the Parliament of the United Kingdom for County Tipperary constituencies (1801–1922)
UK MPs 1841–1847
Whig (British political party) MPs for Irish constituencies
1780 births
1844 deaths